Albert Percy Henderson (29 August 1881 – 20 August 1947) was a Canadian amateur soccer player who competed in the 1904 Summer Olympics. He was born in Galt, Ontario (now Cambridge), and died in Los Angeles, California. In 1904 Henderson was a member of the Galt F.C. team, which won the gold medal in the soccer tournament. He played one match as a forward in which he scored one goal in a 4–0 win over the United States, represented by St. Rose Parish.

References

External links
 the tournament 1904
 Sports-Reference

1881 births
1947 deaths
Canadian soccer players
Canadian people of British descent
Association football forwards
Footballers at the 1904 Summer Olympics
Olympic gold medalists for Canada
Olympic soccer players of Canada
Soccer people from Ontario
Olympic medalists in football
Medalists at the 1904 Summer Olympics